Mujeres Asesinas (English: Killer Women) is an Argentine drama and suspense thriller TV series, based on trilogy of books of the same name by Marisa Grinstein, produced by Pol-ka Producciones and broadcast from 19 July 2005 to 25 March 2008 on the Argentine TV channel Canal 13.

Canal 13 rebroadcast those rated as "Best Episodes" at 23:00 from 4 January 2010.

Plot 
Mujeres Asesinas depicts the homicides committed by women in Argentina discussed in the trilogy of books of the same name by Marisa Grinstein. It has been the recipient of many awards, including the Golden Martin Fierro Award, the highest award granted by the Association of Journalists of Television and Radio Argentina, or APTRA.

Episodes

Cast 
The following is a list of actresses who have made the role of killer in the series:

 Eugenia Tobal
 Juana Viale
 Dolores Fonzi
 Julieta Díaz
 Cristina Banegas
 Cecilia Roth
 Betiana Blum
 Mercedes Morán
 Araceli González
 Ana María Picchio
 Valeria Bertuccelli
 Nahuel Pérez Biscayart
 Andrea Bonelli
 Claudia Fontán
 Julia Calvo
 Edda Bustamante
 Paola Krum
 Romina Gaetani
 Carola Reyna
 Bárbara Lombardo
 Leonor Manso
 Romina Ricci
 María Leal
 Nacha Guevara
 Celeste Cid
 Emilia Mazer
 Gloria Carrá
 Andrea Pietra
 Nancy Dupláa
 Leticia Brédice
 Vera Fogwill
 María Valenzuela
 María Socas
 Manuela Pal
 Agustina Cherri
 Malena Solda
 Ana María Orozco
 Eleonora Wexler
 Laura Novoa
 Virginia Innocenti
 Jazmín Stuart
 Gabriela Toscano
 Andrea del Boca
 Belén Blanco
 Rita Cortese
 Mirta Busnelli
 Julieta Ortega
 María Abadi
 María Onetto
 Valentina Bassi

Martín Fierro Awards 

 Martín Fierro Awards
 Best Unit/ Miniseries 2005 - Winner
 Best Unit / Miniseries 2006 - Nominated
 Best Unit / Miniseries 2007 - Nominated
 Best actress of Unit / Miniseries 2005 - (Inés Estévez) Winner
 Best actress of Unit / Miniseries 2006 - (Cristina Banegas) Winner
 Best actress of Unit / Miniseries 2007 - (Cristina Banegas) Winner

See also 
 Mujeres Asesinas (Mexico)

References

External links 
 Official Weblog
 Official Web (second season)
 Official Web (third season)
 Application firms for possible fifth season
 

Argentine crime television series
2000s Argentine drama television series
2005 Argentine television series debuts
2008 Argentine television series endings
Golden Martín Fierro Award winners
2000s anthology television series
Spanish-language television shows
Pol-ka telenovelas